Kailo Airport  is an airport serving Kailo Territory in Maniema Province, Democratic Republic of the Congo.

See also

 Transport in the Democratic Republic of the Congo
 List of airports in the Democratic Republic of the Congo

References

External links
 FalllingRain - Kailo
 OpenStreetMap - Kailo
 OurAirports - Kailo
 

Airports in Maniema